McVea is a surname. Notable people with the surname include:

Jack McVea (1914–2000), American musician
Sandy McVea (died 1923), Australian boxer and actor
Tennant McVea (born 1988), Northern Irish footballer
Tom McVea (born 1945), former member of the Louisiana House of Representatives
Warren McVea (born 1946), American football player
Sam McVea (1884–1921), Hall of Fame heavyweight boxer

See also
 McVay
 McVeigh
 McVey